"With You" is a song by Greek singer Demis Roussos. It was released as a single in 1974.

Background and writing 
The song was written by Barry Mason and Stélios Vlavianós. The recording was produced by Demis Roussos.

Commercial performance 
The song reached no. 18 in Belgium (Flanders)

Track listing 
7" single Philips 6009 543 (1974, France, Germany, Italy, Netherlands, Norway, etc.)
7" single RTB / Philips S 53804 (1974, Yugoslavia)
 A. "With You" (3:16)
 B. "When Forever Has Gone" (3:32)

Charts

References

External links 

 Demis Roussos — "With You" at Discogs

1974 songs
1974 singles
Demis Roussos songs
Philips Records singles
Songs written by Barry Mason
Songs written by Stélios Vlavianós